The UK Championship is a professional ranking snooker tournament. It is one of snooker's prestigious Triple Crown events, along with the World Championship and the Masters. It is usually held at the Barbican Centre, York. Ronnie O'Sullivan has won the tournament a record seven times, followed by Steve Davis with six titles and Stephen Hendry with five. Mark Allen is the reigning champion, winning his first title in 2022.

History
The UK Championship was first held in 1977 in Tower Circus, Blackpool as the United Kingdom Professional Snooker Championship, an event open only to British residents and passport holders. Patsy Fagan won the inaugural tournament by defeating Doug Mountjoy by 12 frames to 9 in the final and won the first prize of £2000. The following year the event moved to the Guild Hall, Preston, where it remained until 1997.

The rules were changed in 1984 when the tournament was granted ranking status and all professionals were allowed to enter. Since then, it has carried more ranking points than any tournament other than the World Championship until being overtaken by the International Championship and China Open, both of which offer a higher number of ranking points based on the amount of money in pounds sterling on offer for winning the event.

The tournament has seen many memorable finals. In 1977 and 1979, it provided Patsy Fagan and John Virgo with their first and only major tournament wins respectively. In 1980, it was Steve Davis's first of his record 84 professional tournament wins. In 1981, the final between Davis and Terry Griffiths set the stage for four more final battles between Davis and Griffiths that were to dominate the rest of the season before their unexpected losses in the first round of the 1982 World Championship.

In 1983, Alex Higgins beat Davis 16–15 after having trailed 0–7 at the end of the first session. In 1985, Willie Thorne led Davis 13–8 at the start of the evening session, only to miss a simple blue off its spot and lose 16–14. The victory regenerated Davis's confidence after his devastating World Championship loss; Thorne, on the other hand, never won another ranking title.

In 1988, Doug Mountjoy became the oldest winner of the UK Championship aged 46 years old when he was widely viewed as just making up the numbers against the rising Stephen Hendry, producing a stunning display  to win 16–12. Even more astonishingly, he was to win the Mercantile Credit Classic the following month, which at the time made Mountjoy only the fourth player to win two ranking tournaments in a row. This made him the second oldest ranking event winner after Ray Reardon (50).

Stephen Hendry's 1989 win prefigured his decade of dominance similar to the one prefigured by Davis's win in 1980; its significance was emphasised by the fact that the losing finalist was Davis himself. Hendry's 16–15 win the following year, over Davis again, spoke to his unique qualities of nerve. The Hendry/Ken Doherty final of 1994 is considered by many players as one of Hendry's best performance, as he won 10–5 making 7 century breaks along the way, six of which were in the span of eight frames played. Doherty has appeared in two more memorable finals.

In 1993, the format of the final was reduced from the best of 31 frames to the best of 19 frames. This is the format still used for the final to the current day. Ronnie O'Sullivan became the youngest-ever winner of the tournament (and any ranking tournament) aged just 17 years old . Eight years later, in 2001, he delivered the final's best winning margin since it had become the best of 19 frames in the 1993 tournament, beating Ken Doherty 10–1. Three years later, in 2004, Stephen Maguire repeated the feat against David Gray. Doherty almost won the tournament in the 2002 final against Mark Williams, but lost 9–10 in a dramatic deciding frame.

The 2005 tournament saw Davis, aged 48, reach his first ranking tournament final for almost two years and make his highest break in tournament play for 23 years. In a match that featured the widest age gap between finalists in professional tournament history, he lost 6–10 to the 18-year-old Ding Junhui. The following year, Peter Ebdon won the title and, in doing so, became the first and only man to have both won and lost a World and a UK Championship final to Stephen Hendry. The event offered £500,000 prize money, with the winner receiving £70,000.

In 2007, the tournament was won by Ronnie O'Sullivan for the fourth time, again with some ease, as he beat Stephen Maguire 10–2 in the final. The tournament was also notable for the longest televised frame (77 minutes) between Marco Fu and Mark Selby and Ronnie O'Sullivan's maximum 147 break in the deciding frame of the semi-final. The 2009 final saw the reigning world champion John Higgins lose to Ding Junhui, after he missed the brown and the chance to go 8–6 in front.

The 2010 final turned out to be another dramatic match, instantly described by many commentators as an all-time classic. At one point, John Higgins, playing in his first major tournament after the end of a six-month ban for his involvement in match-fixing discussions, was 5–9 down to Mark Williams. However, he won the next two frames. At 7–9, Williams led by 29 points with only 27 on the table, leaving Higgins requiring a snooker to remain in the tournament. Higgins got the snooker and cleared the colours. Another frame won by Higgins took the match to the decider. Finally, with only brown, blue, pink and black left at the table, Higgins potted the brown into a top pocket by playing cross-double across the long axis of the table and then added a difficult long blue and equally difficult pink, thereby winning the frame and thus the tournament by 10–9. In the emotional post-match interview, he described his win as his finest hour and dedicated it to his terminally ill father.

In 2011 the event returned to the Barbican Centre in York,. There was a radical change to the format. All matches up to and including the quarter-finals were changed from the best of 17 frames to the best of 11 frames. In 2013 a 128-player flat draw was used, with all players starting in the first round and all rounds played at the Barbican venue. The tournament was contractually due to stay at the Barbican Centre until 2013, but it also hosted the event in 2014. The 2014 event changed the format once again, with every round up to and including the semi-finals being played over best-of-11 frames. This is the format that is being used to the current day. This tournament saw yet another classic final, as Ronnie O'Sullivan won his fifth title 10–9 over 2011 winner Judd Trump, who had recovered from 9–4 to take the match into a decider.

In 2015, the final featured Australia's Neil Robertson and China's Liang Wenbo, the first time that a UK Championship final had been contested between two overseas players. The 2016 final between Selby and O'Sullivan saw five century breaks in the final six frames of the match as Selby won 10–7. The next two editions of the tournament - in 2017 and 2018, were captured by O'Sullivan who became the first player since Stephen Hendry in 1996 to successfully defend the UK title. In addition, O'Sullivan set a new record for most UK titles with seven.

Between 2012 and 2018, the event has been won by either Neil Robertson, Mark Selby or Ronnie O'Sullivan. Selby (2012 & 2016) and Robertson (2013 & 2015) both have two wins in that period while O'Sullivan has won 3 times (2014, 2017 & 2018). The final line ups of 2013 and 2016 featured a combination of these three players. In the former, Robertson defeated Selby and in the latter Selby beat O'Sullivan.

The tournament has had many different sponsors over the years, including Super Crystalate, Tennents, StormSeal, Royal Liver Assurance, Liverpool Victoria, PowerHouse, Travis Perkins, Maplin Electronics, Pukka Pies, 12BET.com, williamhill.com, Coral, and Betway. It is one of the tournaments televised by the BBC and is held towards the end of each calendar year.

Winners
Sources: cajt.pwp.blueyonder.co.uk, World Professional Billiards and Snooker Association (worldsnooker.com), Snooker Scene (snookerscene.co.uk), snooker.org

Finalists

 Active players are shown in bold.

References

 
1977 establishments in England
Recurring sporting events established in 1977
National championships in the United Kingdom
Snooker ranking tournaments
Snooker competitions in England